Dasht-e Margo (Persian: دشت مارگو), also Dasht-e Mārgow or Dasht-e Margoh, is a desert region in the southern provinces of Nimruz and Helmand in Afghanistan. The desert is adjacent to the Dasht-e Khash and Registan Desert. It is the world's 20th largest desert at about 150,000 km2 in area with an elevation of 500–700 m. The desert consists mainly of sand masses and rocky-clayish plains with solonchaks, takirs, and rarely oases.

The desert's name means "Desert of Death" in Dari, with dasht meaning "plain" and margo meaning "death".

References

External links

Deserts of Afghanistan
Geography of Helmand Province
Geography of Nimruz Province